Ted Kooshian (born October 8, 1961) is an American jazz pianist, keyboardist, and composer who has performed with  Aretha Franklin, Chuck Berry, Marvin Hamlisch, Edgar Winter, Sarah Brightman, Il Divo, and Blood, Sweat, and Tears. Kooshian has played in many Broadway pit orchestras, and has been a member of the Ed Palermo Big Band since 1994.  Originally from San Jose, California, Kooshian has been performing since the 1980s.

He has released five albums: Clockwork (2004), Ted Kooshian's Standard Orbit Quartet (Summit, 2008), Underdog, and Other Stories... (Summit, 2009), Clowns Will Be Arriving (Summit, 2015),  and Hubub! (Summit, 2022).

Discography
 Clockwork (2004)
 Ted Kooshian's Standard Orbit Quartet (Summit, 2008)
 Underdog, and Other Stories... (Summit, 2009)
 Clowns Will Be Arriving (Summit, 2015)
 Hubub! (Summit, 2022)

With Ed Palermo Big Band
 Plays the Music of Frank Zappa
 Take Your Clothes Off When You Dance
 Eddy Loves Frank
 Oh No! Not Jazz!!
 Electric Butter
 It's An Ed Palermo Christmas!
 One Child Left Behind
 The Great Un-American Songbook, Vol's 1 and 2
 The Adventures Of Zodd Zundgren
 A Lousy Day In Harlem
 The Great Un-American Songbook, Vol III
 I've Got News For You: The Music of Edgar Winter

With Judy Barnett
 Swingin
 The Road to my Heart
 Too Darn Hot
 Lust Loss Love

With Rick Wald
 Aural Hieroglyphics
 Castaneda's Dreams
 Play That Thing

With Scott Whitfield
 Speaking of Love
 A Bi-Coastal Christmas, Vol. 1 

With others
 Augie Haas – A 2020 Christmas
 Brett Gold New York Jazz Orchestra – Dreaming Big
 Michael Andrew  – A Swingerhead Christmas
 Pete McGuinness –  Voice Like a Horn
 Swear and Shake –  Maple Ridge
 Art Lillard's Heavenly Big Band – Certain Relationships
 Christopher Saunders – Curtain Call
 Alexis P. Suter Band – Just Another Fool
 Ray Marchica – A Different View

References

External links
 Official site

American jazz pianists
American male pianists
American jazz composers
Living people
1961 births
20th-century American pianists
21st-century American pianists
American male jazz composers
20th-century American male musicians
21st-century American male musicians
Ed Palermo Big Band members
Summit Records artists